Tomáš Frejlach (born 24 November 1985 in Čáslav) is a Czech former football midfielder.

Frejlach also played for the Czech youth national teams at the under-19 and under-21 levels.

References

External links 
 Profile on fotbal.idnes.cz 
 Profile at FC Zbrojovka Brno

1985 births
Living people
Czech footballers
Czech Republic youth international footballers
Czech Republic under-21 international footballers
Czech First League players
FC Slovan Liberec players
FC Baník Ostrava players
People from Čáslav
1. FK Příbram players
SK Slavia Prague players
FC Zbrojovka Brno players
Association football midfielders
Sportspeople from the Central Bohemian Region